Liavaag may refer to:

Ove Liavaag (1938–2007), Norwegian civil servant
Mount Liavaag, mountain in Ellsworth Land, Antarctica